The 2017–18 season in Primera División de Nicaragua will be divided into two tournaments (Apertura and Clausura) and will determine the 69th and 70th champions in the history of the league. The Apertura tournament will be played in the second half of 2017, while the Clausura will be played in the first half of 2018.

Format
The Apertura play-off format was changed from previous years, while the Clausura will use the same 4-team play-off format. For the Apetura, the top four teams from the regular stage advanced to a "quadrangular" double-round robin instead of a play-off stage. The regular stage and quadrangular winners would have played to decide the tournament's champion, but ultimately the same team won both and the final was not necessary. The same format was recently adopted by the Costa Rican Primera División, but for both half season.

Team information 

A total of 10 teams will contest the league, including 8 sides from the 2016–17 Primera División 2 sides from the 2016–17 Segunda División.

At the end of the 2016–17 Primera División, Nandasmo finished last in the aggregate table and were relegated to the Segunda División. Taking their place was the champions from the Segunda División, Deportivo Ocotal.

The 9th place team in the aggregate table, Deportivo Sebaco, faced the second place team from the Segunda División, San Francisco Masachapa, in a playoff for a spot in the Primera División. San Francisco Masachapa won the playoff 3-2 on aggregate and were promoted, while Deportivo Sebaco were relegated.

Promotion and relegation 

Promoted from Segunda División as of June, 2017.

 Champions: Ocotal
 Runners-up (via playoff): San Francisco Masachapa

Relegated to Segunda División  as of June, 2017.

 Last Place: Nandasmo
 Ninth Place (via playoff): Deportivo Sebaco

Personnel and sponsoring

Apertura

Personnel and sponsoring

Managerial changes

During the season

Standings

Records

Top Goalscorers

Results

Playoffs

Semi-finals 

1-1. Walter Ferretti advanced on Penalties.

2-2. Managua advanced on away goal.

Finals 

1-1. Walter Ferretti won on away goal

Clausura

Personnel and sponsoring

Managerial changes

Before the Clasura season

During the Clasura season

Standings

Results

Records

Top Goalscorers

Playoffs

Semi-finals 

Real Esteli won 3-1 on aggregate.

Diriangen won 3-2 on aggregate.

Finals 

Diriangen won 3-2 on aggregate.

List of foreign players in the league 
This is a list of foreign players in the 2017–18 season. The following players:

 Have played at least one game for the respective club.
 Have not been capped for the Nicaragua national football team on any level, independently from the birthplace

A new rule was introduced this season, that clubs can have four foreign players per club  and can only add a new player if there is an injury or a player/s is released and it's before the close of the season transfer window.

Chinandega
  Jairo Olivares
  Jarel Puerto
  Brayan Cañate
  Richard Charris 
  Allan Gutiérrez

Diriangén
  Henry Niño 
  Francisco Rodriguez 
  Erick Alcázar 
  Johan Bonilla 
  Brandon Salazar 
  Andrés Mendoza
  Pedro Dos Santos
  Josué Meneses
  Carlos Tórres
  Yeison Esquivel

Juventus Managua
  Maycon Santana
  Luis Fernando González
  Darwin Guity
  Carlos Félix
  Diego de la Cruz

Managua
  Cristiano Fernández da Lima
  Vinicius da Souza
  Lucas Oliviera
  Armando Valdez
  Lisandro Andino 
  Edward Morillo 
  Oscar Urróz

Masachapa/San Francisco
  Brandon Mena
  Carlos Mosquera 
  Ever Rodríguez 
  Ernesto Benítez
  Enzo Brahim 
  Raúl Nomesque

Ocotal
  Cristhian Cabria 
  Nelson Maldonado
  Rolín Álvarez 
  Erlyn Ruíz 
  Marcos Rivera 
  Juan Sebastián Bedoya

Real Estelí
  Gregorio Torres
  Gabriel Da Silva  
  Revson Santos 
  Lucas Rodríguez 
  Gastón Pagan 
  Guillermo Sierra
  Jorge Betancur 
  Richard Rodríguez
  Pablo Gállego

Real Madriz
  Edder Mondragón
  Mauricio Castañeda 
  Marel Álvarez
  Marlon Barrios
  Jesus Guerrero

UNAN
  Ever Benítez 
  Daniel Venancio 
  Franklin García
  Gledson Pereira
  Rodrigo Hernández
  Juan Diego Uribe
  Oscar Castillo Palomino

Walter Ferretti
  Yosimar Rivera
  Rafael De Almeida 
  Robinson Luiz
  José Bernardo Laureiro 
  Eder Munive

 (player released during the Apertura season)
 (player released between the Apertura and Clausura seasons)
 (player released during the Clausura season)

Aggregate table

References

External links
 http://www.ligaprimera.com/ocotal
 https://int.soccerway.com/national/nicaragua/primera-division/20172018/apertura/r41773/

Nicaraguan Primera División seasons
1
Nicaragua